Midtown may refer to:

Places within cities

Canada
 Midtown, Toronto, Ontario

Japan
 Tokyo Midtown

United States
 Midtown, Agoura Hills, California
 Midtown Atlanta, Georgia
 Midtown station (MARTA), a railroad station near this area
 MidTown (Columbus, Georgia)
 Midtown Detroit, Michigan
 Midtown, Harrisburg, Pennsylvania
 Midtown, Houston, Texas
 Midtown Manhattan, New York
 Midtown, Memphis, Tennessee
 Midtown Miami, Florida
 Midtown Interchange, an interchange in the aforementioned location
 Midtown, Minneapolis, Minnesota
 Midtown Oklahoma City, Oklahoma
 Midtown Omaha, Nebraska
 Midtown Phoenix, Arizona
 Midtown Sacramento, California
 Midtown San Antonio, several neighborhoods of San Antonio, Texas
 Midtown San Jose, California
 Midtown St. Louis, Missouri

Other uses
Midtown (band), a pop punk band
Midtown, Loch Ewe, a location in the Northwest Highlands of Scotland
Midtown, Sutherland, a hamlet in the Scottish Highlands
Midtown, Tennessee, U.S., an unincorporated community, formerly a town
Midtown Madness, a racing game by Microsoft and Angel Studios
Midtown Plaza (Rochester, New York), U.S., a shopping mall